Orphaned technology is a descriptive term for computer products, programs, and platforms that have been abandoned by their original developers.  Orphaned technology refers to software, such as abandonware and antique software, but also to computer hardware and practices.  In computer software standards and documentation, deprecation is the gradual phasing-out of a software or programming language feature, while orphaning usually connotes a sudden discontinuation, usually for business-related reasons, of a product with an active user base.

For users of technologies that have been withdrawn from the market, there is a choice between maintaining their software support environments in some form of emulation, or switching to other supported products, possibly losing capabilities unique to their original solution.

Abandoning a technology is not only due to bad or outmoded idea. There are instances, such as the case of some medical technologies, where products are phased out the market because they are no longer viable as business ventures. Some orphaned technologies do not suffer complete abandonment or obsolescence. For instance, there is the case of IBM's Silicon Germanium (SiGe) technology, which is a program that produced an in situ doped alloy as a replacement for the conventional implantation step in silicon semiconductor bipolar process. The technology was previously orphaned but was continued again by a small team at IBM so that it emerged as a leading product in the high-volume communications marketplace. Technologies orphaned due to failure on the part of their startup developers can be picked up by another investor. This is demonstrated by Wink, an IoT technology orphaned when its parent company Quirky filed for bankruptcy. The platform, however, continued after it was purchased by another company called Flex.

Some well-known examples of orphaned technology include:
 Coleco ADAM - 8-bit home computer
 TI 99/4A - 16-bit home computer
 Mattel Aquarius
 Apple Lisa - 16/32-bit graphical computer
 Newton PDA (Apple Newton) - tablet computer
 DEC Alpha - 64-bit microprocessor
 HyperCard - hypermedia
 ICAD (KBE) - knowledge-based engineering
 Javelin Software - modeling and data analysis
 LISP machines - LISP oriented computers
 Classic Mac OS - m68k and PowerPC operating system
 Microsoft Bob - graphical helper
 Windows 9x - x86 operating system
 OpenDoc - compound documents (Mac OS, OS/2)
 Prograph - visual programming system
 Poly-1 - parallel networked computer designed in New Zealand for use in education and training
 Mosaic notation program - music notation application by Mark of the Unicorn
 Open Music System - Gibson

Symbolics Inc's operating systems, Genera and OpenGenera, were twice orphaned, as they were ported from LISP machines to computers using the Alpha 64-bit CPU.

User groups often exist for specific orphaned technologies, such as The Hong Kong Newton User Group, Symbolics Lisp [Machines] Users' Group (now known as the Association of Lisp Users), and Newton Reference.  The Save Sibelius group sprang into existence because Sibelius (scorewriter) users feared the application would be orphaned after its owners Avid Tech fired most of the development team, who were thereafter hired by Steinberg to develop the competing product, Dorico.

See also
 Orphan works
 Abandonware
 Planned obsolescence

References

 
Orphan works
Technological change
Information technology